The E-75 Expressway or Murree Expressway (Urdu,) (also known as the Islamabad-Murree-Muzaffarabad Expressway) is a four-lane partially operational controlled-access expressway linking Islamabad to Murree in Punjab province. The second section between Murree and Muzaffarabad, Azad Jammu and Kashmir is currently under construction.

The project was planned in 2000 during Pervez Musharraf's government. However, work only started in 2008. It was inaugurated by Prime Minister Yousaf Raza Gillani on 30 August 2011.

Route 
The expressway passes through Bhara Kahu, Murree, Phulgran, Upper Topa, Lower Topa, Bhurban, Aliyot and Phagwari before terminating outside Kohala. The expressway then continues as S-2 Strategic Highway from Kohala to Muzaffarabad.

Gallery

See also
Motorways of Pakistan
National Highways of Pakistan
Transport in Pakistan
National Highway Authority

References 

75
75